On 16 July 2022, a group of around 20 gunmen entered the Kampung Nonggolait (or Nogolait) in Nduga Regency, Highland Papua, Indonesia. The attackers opened fire on a grocer, and then shot seven traders riding on a freight truck. Four bystanders were also shot.

During the shooting, eleven people were killed and two were wounded. All of the victims were men, most of whom came from other Indonesian islands. Indonesian authorities suspected the Free Papua Movement's militant wing, the West Papua National Liberation Army, of responsibility, specifically of Army Tabuni and Egianus Kogoya group. Victims of the attack were Daeng Maramhli (42) ustad of Kampung Nonggolait, Eliaser Baye (54) indigenous priest of Kampung Nonggolait from Kenyam, Yulius Watu (23), Habertus Goti (23), Taufah Amir (42), Johan (26), Alex (45), Sirajudin (27), Yuda Gurusinga (42), dan Mahmud Ismaul (50) driver for Bupati of Nduga. Meanwhile survivors of the attack were Hasjon (41) severely harmed, and Sudarmintao hit by ricochet. Meanwhile the body of a construction worker Roy Manampiring (42) was found not far from the incident, according to local inhabitants travelling with him, the armed group block their route on their journey home to Nonggolait and killed Manampiring while the other fled to the jungle. West Papua National Liberation Army claimed responsibility for the attack which was carried out by Egianus Kogoya group and threatens to shoot more civilians including teachers and nurses. The attacks happened at four different crime scenes by 15 - 20 gunmen using long-barreled weapons and sharp weapons.

See also
 Nduga massacre
 Telkomsel shooting

References

2022 mass shootings in Asia
2022 murders in Indonesia
21st-century mass murder in Indonesia
History of Highland Papua
July 2022 crimes in Asia
July 2022 events in Indonesia
Mass murder in 2022
Mass shootings in Indonesia
Papua conflict